Playing Away is a 1986 TV comedy film directed by Horace Ové, from a screenplay by Caryl Phillips.

Premise
In the story, an English cricket team, fictitiously named "Sneddington" (based in Lavenham, Suffolk), invites a team of West Indian heritage based in Brixton (South London) to play a charity game in support of their "Third World Week." According to Screenonline, "The gentle comedy of manners and unexpected reversal of white and black stereotypes in Playing Away contrasts sharply with the stylistic experimentation and the militant denunciations of racial prejudice in director Horace Ové's earlier feature, Pressure (1975)."

Reception
New York Times reviewer Vincent Canby called it "witty and wise without being seriously disturbing for a minute".

Production 
The cricket match scenes were filmed at Botany Bay Cricket Club in Enfield, London.

The film cost £924,000.

Cast
Norman Beaton
Nicholas Farrell
Brian Bovell
Ross Kemp
Gary Beadle
Trevor Thomas
Ram John Holder
Bruce Purchase
Joseph Marcell
Patrick Holt
Neil Morrissey

References

External links 

New York Times Film Review
Time Out Film Guide.

1986 films
British sports comedy films
Cricket films
Black British cinema
Black British mass media
Black British films
1980s British films
British comedy television films